Špela Pretnar (born 5 March 1973) is a Slovenian former alpine skier.

In her career, Pretnar won six races in Alpine Skiing World Cup races, with 13 podiums altogether. In the 1999–2000 season, she won a small crystal globe in slalom. Pretnar was named Slovenian sportswoman of the year in 2000. Pretnar represented Slovenia at the 2002 Winter Olympics.

Pretnar was a sports reporter at a Slovenian commercial TV station POP TV.She have a son with name Mak Rebolj (born October 2010).

World Cup results

Season titles

Season standings

Race podiums
 6 wins – (5 SL, 1 GS)
 13 podiums – (9 SL, 3 GS, 1 SG)

References 

1973 births
Living people
Slovenian female alpine skiers
Olympic alpine skiers of Slovenia
Alpine skiers at the 1992 Winter Olympics
Alpine skiers at the 1994 Winter Olympics
Alpine skiers at the 1998 Winter Olympics
Alpine skiers at the 2002 Winter Olympics
People from Bled
FIS Alpine Ski World Cup champions